Kaon may refer to:

 Kaon, a subatomic particle
 KAON, an ontology infrastructure 
 Kaon Interactive, a video game developer of Terra (computer game)
 Kaon, a character in the Japanese manga Kyoshiro to Towa no Sora
 Kaón, former name of a mountain from Denia, Spain, now called Montgo
 Kaon, A city on Cybertron in Transformers Prime, where Megatron began his reign as a Decepticon and made his capitol
 KAONMEDIA, a South Korean company manufacturing connectivity devices.
 Birra Kaon, an Albanian beer.

See also 
 Kao (disambiguation)